The Engleman-Thomas Building, at 200 S. Main in Aztec, New Mexico, was built in 1906.  It was listed on the National Register of Historic Places in 1985.

It is a brick-walled building with brick sills and segmental arches, and with "corbelled and zipperbrick cornice."  Its interior includes a row of chamfered wooden posts with wooden corbel capitals running down the middle of the open first floor.

Its significance in 1985 was assessed as follows: "Built in 1906, this commercial building typifies the often modest construction which accompanied the city's railroad boom. Built of local brick, its ornamentation is concentrated in its Decorative Brick style cornices—a zipperbrick and dentil cornice on the front and a corbeled cornice stepping down along the side. The original owner, N. M. Engleman, and later J. M. Thomas operated dry goods stores on the ground floor. Short-term lodgings and an office occupy the second floor. Indian motifs are painted on window shades behind the facade transoms. These are the result of a suggestion in the 1960s by an Albuquerque planning consultant that the community cater to tourists visiting the Aztec Ruins National Monument by adopting an Indian theme. The fan tile in the sidewalk corners (visible in ills. 9) are also a result of this ill-fated notion."

It has also been known as Old Post Office.

References

Post office buildings in New Mexico
National Register of Historic Places in San Juan County, New Mexico
Office buildings completed in 1906
1906 establishments in New Mexico Territory